The Southern Air Command (SAC) of the Indian Air Force (IAF) is headquartered in Thiruvananthapuram, which is on the southwestern side of India. This is one among the seven commands of IAF. This command was started on 19 July 1984 and is relatively new among the other commands. The conflicts in Sri Lanka and the need for establishing a strong base over the Indian Ocean resulted to the formation of this new command. The SAC was inaugurated by Prime Minister Indira Gandhi.

From 1984 to 1999, the command grew from 5 lodger units to 17 lodger units under its jurisdiction. 
Air-sea rescue in the Indian Ocean may be among the command's tasks.

Organization

Squadrons include:

Air Officer Commanding-in-Chief

References

External links
 Indian Air Force, Southern Air Command

Commands of the Indian Air Force
Military units and formations established in 1984
Military units and formations of the Indian Air Force
Organisations based in Thiruvananthapuram
1984 establishments in Kerala